The North Peace Navigators are a junior "B" ice hockey team based in Peace River, Alberta, Canada. They are members of the North West Junior Hockey League (NWJHL). They play their home games at Baytex Energy Centre.

The Navigators have won seven regular season titles - six playoff titles and one Russ Barnes Trophy (Alberta provincial Jr. B Champions) since 2003.  They have also won a silver medal and had 2 bronze medal finishes at the Provincials.

Season-by-season record
Note: GP = Games played, W = Wins, L = Losses, OTL = Overtime Losses, Pts = Points, GF = Goals for, GA = Goals against, PIM = Penalties in minutes

Russ Barnes Trophy
Alberta Jr. B Provincial Championships

Keystone Cup history
Western Canadian Jr. B Championship (Northern Ontario to British Columbia)Six teams in round robin play. 1st vs. 2nd for gold/silver; 3rd vs. 4th for bronze.

References

External links
Official website of the North Peace Navigators

Ice hockey teams in Alberta
2000 establishments in Alberta
Ice hockey clubs established in 2000